Laverne's North Main Street District, in Laverne, Oklahoma, is a historic district which was listed on the National Register of Historic Places in 1984.  The listing included 10 contributing buildings.

It runs along the north side of Main street, running west from Broadway, and includes Plains Commercial architecture.

References

Historic districts on the National Register of Historic Places in Oklahoma
National Register of Historic Places in Harper County, Oklahoma
Buildings and structures completed in 1912